Miguel Angel de León Lopez (born February 23, 1962) is a Venezuelan actor. He is better known simply as Miguel de León. He has acted mainly in telenovelas, which garnered him international fame across Latin America, where the genre is popular, particularly among women. He is also known to Hispanic audiences in the United States.

Biography
De León was born in Caracas, Venezuela, and graduated from the Colegio Universitario de Caracas with a degree in business administration. Continuing with his studies, de León joined the Taller Universitario de Teatro Macanillas. After graduating from that school, de León became a staff member at Radio Caracas Television, where he studied acting further.

His acting debut came in a 1988 film, Señora Bolero ("Ms. Bolero"). Later that year, he participated in his first telenovela, Sueño Contigo ("I dream of you"). He was soon signed to a multi-year contract by Radio Caracas Television. Other films de León has acted in include a Venezuelan version of Batman, and El Cristo de las Violetas ("Jesus of the violets").

In 1989, de León played "Leonardo" in La Revancha ("The rematch"), a major Venevision hit. He acted in four other telenovelas before his first appearance at a major international hit, 1993's Kassandra, where he played "Ernesto Rangel", acting alongside Puerto Rican actor Osvaldo Ríos, among others.

During the middle 1990s, de León married another Venezuelan telenovela star, Gaby Spanic. He had been previously married to Nubia Quilarte.

After Kassandra, de León made three more telenovelas before he and his wife decided to accept offers by Mexico's Televisa. The couple then moved to Mexico City. 1998's Gotita de amor ("Small drop of love") marked de León's debut in Mexican telenovelas. He acted alongside Laura Flores, Julio Alemán, Raúl Araiza Jr., Niurka Marcos, Adriana Fonseca, Andrea Lagunes and Daniela Luján, among others, in that telenovela. Next, he and his wife starred together in La usurpadora, which also became a major international hit. Around that time, de León obtained Mexican citizenship, which he later gave up after returning to Venezuela.

2000s Carita de Angel ("Angel Face"), gave de León an opportunity to act alongside acting legends Libertad Lamarque and Silvia Pinal. In 2001, de León acted in an episode of the well-known series, Mujer, Casos de la Vida Real ("Women, real life stories").

Around that time, his wife left Mexico to film a telenovela in Colombia alongside actor José Ángel Llamas. Rumors of an adulterous relationship between his wife and Llamas surfaced, and the couple eventually divorced. In 2002, de León returned to Venezuela. His last Mexican telenovela was recorded before he left; ¡Vivan los niños! ("Long live the children") put de León with child star Andrea Legarreta and with Juan Ferrara.

 2003 - Alegrijes y Rebujos (Mexico)
 2004 - Mariana de la Noche (Mexico)

Miguel de León has filmed three other telenovelas after returning to Venezuela. He was signed by Venevision to work for that channel.

Filmography

References

External links

1962 births
Living people
People from Caracas
Venezuelan male telenovela actors